Palanga may refer to several places:

 Palanga, a city in western Lithuania
 Palanga, a village in Popeşti Commune, Argeș County, Romania
 Palanga, a village in Amărăști Commune, Vâlcea County, Romania
Palanga Rural District, in Ardabil Province, Iran